Charles Henry Robb (November 14, 1867 – June 10, 1939) was an American lawyer from Vermont and Washington, DC.  He was most notable for his service as an Associate Justice of the United States Court of Appeals for the District of Columbia.

A native of Malone, New York. Robb grew up in Lincoln, Rhode Island, Troy, New York, New York and Guilford, Vermont, and graduated from West Brattleboro, Vermont's Glenwood Seminary in 1886. He studied law, attained admission to the bar, and began to practice in Bellows Falls, Vermont, in 1892. A Republican, he served as Windham County, Vermont State's Attorney for three years (1896-1899). Robb was a United States Assistant Attorney General in the United States Post Office Department from 1903 to 1904.

In 1906, Robb was appointed an associate justice of the Court of Appeals of the District of Columbia (now the United States Court of Appeals for the District of Columbia Circuit). He served until assuming senior status in 1937. Robb died in Washington, D.C., on June 10, 1939.

Education and career

Robb's original family name was spelled "Robideau", "Robadeau" and "Rubadeau".  He was born in Malone, New York, the son of Isaac M. Robb and Clara Slater Matthews. He was raised in Lincoln, Rhode Island, Troy, New York, New York and Guilford, Vermont.  Robb attended Brattleboro, Vermont's Brattleboro High School and graduated from West Brattleboro's Glenwood Seminary in 1886.  He began studies for the entrance examination to attend the United States Military Academy, but decided to study law instead.  He studied with the firm of Kittredge Haskins and Edgar W. Stoddard, was admitted to the bar in 1892, and practiced in Bellows Falls from 1894 to 1902. A Republican, from 1896 to 1899 he served as State's Attorney of Windham County. He then served as an attorney for the Internal Revenue Service. While practicing law in Vermont, Robb was also involved in business and banking, and was an incorporator and officer of the Bellows Falls Trust Company. He was also active in both the Vermont and American Bar Associations. From 1903 to 1904, Robb was a United States Assistant Attorney General in the United States Post Office Department, where he investigated wrongdoing and prosecuted corrupt officials. Robb served as an assistant to the United States Attorney General from 1904 to 1906.

Federal judicial service
Robb received a recess appointment from President Theodore Roosevelt on October 5, 1906, to an Associate Justice seat on the Court of Appeals of the District of Columbia (now the United States Court of Appeals for the District of Columbia Circuit) which had been vacated by Charles Holland Duell. He was nominated to the same position by President Roosevelt on December 3, 1906. He was confirmed by the United States Senate on December 11, 1906, and received his commission the same day. He assumed senior status on November 15, 1937. His service terminated on June 10, 1939, due to his death in Washington, D.C.

Other service
While serving on the bench Robb was also a member of the faculty at the National University Law School (now George Washington University Law School). In 1926, National University awarded Robb the honorary degree of LL.D.

Family
In 1897, Robb married Nettie M. George, the daughter of Dr. Ozias M. George of Bellows Falls. His son Roger Robb also served as a United States Circuit Judge of the United States Court of Appeals for the District of Columbia. His daughter Priscilla (October 20, 1914 – November 20, 2011) was the wife of airline pilot Elliot A. Billings (November 22, 1912 – November 7, 2011). Robb was a member of the Episcopal Church.

References

Sources
 

1867 births
1939 deaths
People from Windham County, Vermont
Vermont Republicans
Vermont lawyers
State's attorneys in Vermont
Lawyers from Washington, D.C.
United States Department of the Treasury officials
United States Department of Justice officials
United States Postal Service people
Judges of the United States Court of Appeals for the D.C. Circuit
United States court of appeals judges appointed by Theodore Roosevelt
20th-century American judges
George Washington University faculty
United States federal judges admitted to the practice of law by reading law